The Australian Antarctic Data Centre is a section of the Australian Antarctic Division, which forms part of the Australian Government, Commonwealth of Australia, in the Department of the Environment and Energy.

AADC services form the backbone of data collection and data management in Australia's Antarctic Science Program.

Services 
 Managing science data from Australia's Antarctic research (acquiring, indexing, storing, disseminating, linking and data mining)
 Mapping Australia's areas of interest in the Antarctic region
 Managing Australia's Antarctic state of the environment reporting
 Fabricating, installing and managing Australia's Antarctic station tide gauges
 Providing advice and education and a range of other products

Purpose 
The AADC undertakes its role in alignment with the National Antarctic data management policy.

Scientific data are key (and highly valuable) outputs of Australia's Antarctic Science Program and therefore should be managed for posterity.

Article III.1.c of the Antarctic Treaty states that "to the greatest extent feasible and practicable" ... "scientific observations and results from Antarctica shall be exchanged and made freely available"

The Australian Antarctic Data Centre participates in the WorldWideScience global science gateway.

External links 
 The Australian Antarctic Data Centre website
 The Australian Antarctic Division website
 The World Wide Science website

Commonwealth Government agencies of Australia
Scientific organisations based in Australia
Australian Antarctic Territory